Shlon is the fourth studio album by Syrian musician Omar Souleyman. It was released on 22 November 2019 under Mad Decent.

The first single from the album, "Layle" was released on October 16, 2019.

Critical reception
Shlon was met with generally favorable reviews from critics. At Metacritic, which assigns a weighted average rating out of 100 to reviews from mainstream publications, this release received an average score of 79, based on 9 reviews

Track listing

References

2019 albums
Mad Decent albums